The 60 Yard Line is a 2017 American comedy film directed by Leif Gantvoort and produced by Ryan Churchill.

Premise
The film is based on the true story of two best friends who purchase a house adjacent to Lambeau Field, the home of the Green Bay Packers. The film centers on the choices the friends must make between their love of football and their personal lives.

Cast
 Ryan Churchill as Ben 'Zagger' Zagowski, a huge Green Bay Packers fan and shipping clerk who is engaged to Amy
 Kimberley Crossman as Amy Etzman, Zagger's longtime fiance and co-worker
 Nic Greco as Nick 'Polano' Polano, Zagger's best friend, coworker, and a Chicago Bears fan
 Jacquelyn Zook as Debbie Zagowski, Zagger's sister and friend of Amy
 Chelsey Crisp as Jody Johnson, a Packers fan who becomes friends with Zagger
 Leif Gantvoort as Greg Hayes, a shipping executive who is Amy and Zagger's boss
 Mindy Sterling as Linda Zagowski, Zagger's mom and part owner of the family business
 John D'Aquino as John Zagowski, Zagger's dad and part owner of the family business
 Randall Park as Trapper, a longtime Packers fan who secretly lives in Zagger's garage

The film also features multiple cameo appearances by former Packers players, including former Packers players Ahman Green, John Kuhn, and Mark Tauscher. Tom Zalaski and Burke Griffin, Green Bay TV personalities, former Green Bay mayor Jim Schmitt, and mixed martial artist Chuck Liddell also make appearances.

Production
The 60 Yard Line was primarily filmed on-location in Green Bay, although a few scenes were filmed in various locations in Los Angeles. Filming occurred in the fall of 2015, with additional scenes that required snow being filmed in the winter of 2016. The film was completed on a "limited budget".

Release
The film released in 2017 at select theaters across the United States, with special screenings occurring in the fall of 2017. It formally premiered at the Wisconsin Film Festival on April 2, 2017. It was also played at the 2018 Beloit International Film Festival and won multiple awards at the Los Angeles Film Festival and the Wisconsin Film Festival.

The movie was released on DVD, Blu-ray, and iTunes on November 7, 2017.

References

External links
 
 
 
 

2017 comedy films
History of the Green Bay Packers
2010s English-language films